Promises for the Imperfect is Number One Gun's second studio album. It was released by Tooth & Nail Records. It reached #31 on Billboard's Top Christian Albums chart.

Track listing
 "Pretend" - 2:49
 "Regrets of Photographs" - 3:03
 "We Are" - 3:20
 "Fireside Wing" - 3:04
 "There Is Hope" - 3:35
 "Who You Are" - 3:17
 "All You Have" - 4:07
 "Golden Smile" - 3:28
 "The Time Is Now" - 3:17
 "Life Is What You Make It" - 5:25

References

Number One Gun albums
2005 albums
Tooth & Nail Records albums
Albums produced by Aaron Sprinkle